Roger William Mehle (October 16, 1915August 30, 1997) was a United States Navy Rear admiral.

Early life and education
Mehle was born in Cincinnati, Ohio.

Career
He graduated from flight training at Naval Air Station Pensacola in June 1939, then joined VF-3 and carrier-qualified in July 1939. He was then transferred to VF-6 flying the Grumman F4F Wildcat as part of the 's air group.

World War II
On 1 February, Enterprises Task Force 8 raided Kwajalein, Wotje, and Maloelap in the Marshall Islands, sinking three ships, damaging eight, and destroying numerous airplanes and ground facilities. That afternoon, the Japanese attempted a counterstrike against the Enterprise, Mehle took off and shot down a Japanese Aichi E13A seaplane and later with two other VF-6 fighters shot down a Mitsubishi G3M bomber. For his actions Mehle was awarded the Distinguished Flying Cross.

On 24 February Mehle and two other VF-6 fighters shot down a Kawanishi H6K near Wake Island.

In March 1942 Mehle became the executive officer of VF-6.

On 11 June 1944 Mehle shot down two Mitsubishi A6M Zero fighters near the Mariana Islands. On 19 June, Mehle achieved ace status by shooting down two Nakajima B6N torpedo-bombers in the aerial battles that became known as the Great Marianas Turkey Shoot.

On 28 December 1944 Mehle was awarded the Silver Star for gallantry for the period from 15 May to 26 December 1944.

Vietnam War
From January 1965 to December 1966, Mehle served as Director, Strike Warfare Division, Office of the Chief of Naval Operations and received his first Legion of Merit for this service.

From February to May 1967, Mehle was Commander Attack Carrier Striking Force, Seventh Fleet and from May to September 1967 he was Commander Carrier Division Five.

From July 1968 to June 1970, Mehle served as Commander, Naval Safety Center.

Mehle retired from active service in 1970.

Personal life
Mehle married Aileen Elder in 1939 and they had a son Roger Jr in 1941. They later divorced and Aileen Mehle became famous as a society columnist.

Mehle married model Dorian Leigh in August 1948. Their daughter Young Eve Mehle was born on March 27, 1949. Mehle and Leigh divorced on November 24, 1954.

Mehle died on August 30, 1997.

References

1915 births
1997 deaths
American World War II flying aces
Recipients of the Silver Star
Recipients of the Legion of Merit
Recipients of the Distinguished Flying Cross (United States)
United States Navy admirals
Military personnel from Cincinnati